Osage, Texas, may refer to:
Osage, Colorado County, Texas
Osage, Coryell County, Texas